Taking a Chance is a 1928 American silent Western film directed by Norman Z. McLeod and written by A.H. Halprin. The film stars Rex Bell, Lola Todd, Richard Carlyle, Billy Butts, Jack Byron and Martin Cichy. The film was released on November 18, 1928, by Fox Film Corporation.

Cast   
 Rex Bell as Joe Courtney
 Lola Todd as Jessie Smith
 Richard Carlyle as Dan Carson
 Billy Butts as Little Billy
 Jack Byron as Pete
 Martin Cichy as Luke
 Jack Henderson as Jake

References

External links
 

1928 films
1928 Western (genre) films
Fox Film films
Films directed by Norman Z. McLeod
American black-and-white films
Silent American Western (genre) films
1920s English-language films
1920s American films